Milan Randić (born 1 October 1930) is a Croatian American scientist who is one of the leading experts in the field of computational chemistry.

Birth and education
Randić was born in the city of Belgrade, where his parents, originally from Kostrena (Croatian Primorje – Region in the northern Adriatic), lived at the time. Kostrena is well known by its maritime tradition, shipowners and seamen. Randic's ancestors were sailing ship owners as well as ship captains. His parents moved to Zagreb in 1941, where he continued his education.
After finishing Gymnasium in Zagreb, he studied Theoretical Physics at the University of Zagreb during 1949–1953 and studied for Ph. D degree at the University of Cambridge, England (1954–1958).

Academic career
From 1960 to 1970 he was at the Ruđer Bošković Institute in Zagreb, Croatia, where he founded the Theoretical Chemistry Group.  During 1971–1980 he was visiting various universities in USA including Johns Hopkins, MIT, Harvard, Tufts, and Cornell.  With 1973 his research oriented towards application of Discrete Mathematics and Graph Theory in particular to characterization of molecules and bio-molecules.  During 1980 to 1997 he was professor in the Department of Mathematics and Computer Science at Drake University, Des Moines, Iowa.  During the past 15 years he is spending three months each year at the National Institute of Chemistry, Ljubljana, Slovenia collaborating with scientists from its Laboratory for Chemometrics.

Research and achievements
Randić has been a major contributor to the development of mathematical chemistry, in particular to the development and use of molecular descriptors based on the use of Graph Theory. In 1975 he introduced the Randić index, the first connectivity index.

He is a corresponding member of the Croatian Academy of Sciences and Arts and founder of the International Academy of Mathematical Chemistry, the seat of which is in Dubrovnik, Croatia.   With year 2000 his research has been mostly shifted towards Bioinformatics, with particular emphasis on graphical representation and numerical characterization of DNA, proteins and proteome, though his fascination with Kekulé valence structures and aromaticity remains undiminished.  He is Honorary Member of The Croatian Chemical Society, The International Academy of Mathematical Chemistry and The National Institute of Chemistry, Ljubljana, Slovenia.

His other interests include development of Nobel, a universal ideographic writing system.

See also
 Chemical graph theory
 Hyper-Wiener index
 Resistance distance

References

Selected publications

Living people
1930 births
Croatian chemists
Mathematical chemistry
Faculty of Science, University of Zagreb alumni
Computational chemists
Scientists from Zagreb